Charlie Hodge may refer to:

Charlie Hodge (guitarist) (1934–2006), musician and guitarist for Elvis Presley
Charlie Hodge (ice hockey) (1933–2016), National Hockey League goaltender

See also
Charles Hodge (1797–1878), Principal of Princeton Theological Seminary, 1851–1878, Calvinist
Charles Hodges (disambiguation)